MLB Slugfest is a series of baseball games developed by Sports Mogul, Gratuitous Games and Midway Games, and released by Midway Games for major console systems such as PlayStation 2, GameCube, and Xbox. The game bills itself as a more "street" style baseball game, including more mature / aggressive themes, the ability to attack other players, and urban-styled in-game commentary.

The series' emphasis on exaggerated, arcade-style gameplay as opposed to realistic simulations, can be compared to Midway's own NFL Blitz and NHL Hitz games, which were also having entries released around the same time.

Currently, there are four games in the series: MLB Slugfest 20-03, MLB Slugfest 20-04, MLB Slugfest: Loaded and MLB Slugfest 2006.

Loaded is the only baseball game in history to receive a Teen rating from the ESRB.

Slugfest 2006, the newest version of the four, has inspired a cult-following based on its glitches and overall hijinks.

The announcers in the game are Tim Kitzrow, who also voiced the announcer in the NHL Hitz, NBA Jam, and the NFL Blitz series and Jimmy Shorts who is voiced by Kevin Matthews.

External links

Game Boy Advance games
Major League Baseball video games
Midway video games
GameCube games
PlayStation 2 games
Video game franchises
Video games developed in the United States
Xbox games